Noémie Kober (born 15 December 1993) is a French rower. She competed in the women's coxless pair event at the 2016 Summer Olympics.

References

External links
 

1993 births
Living people
French female rowers
Olympic rowers of France
Rowers at the 2016 Summer Olympics
Place of birth missing (living people)
Rowers at the 2010 Summer Youth Olympics